Solution selling is a type and style of sales and selling methodology. Solution selling has a salesperson or sales team use a sales process that is a problem-led (rather than product-led) approach to determine if and how a change in a product could bring specific improvements that are desired by the customer. The term "solution" implies that the proposed new product produces improved outcomes and successfully resolves the customer problem. Business-to-business sales (B2B) organizations are more likely to use solution selling and similar sales methodologies.

Solution selling has value and application in high complexity sales and selling situations. This complexity can be the result of existing customer circumstances, or the proposed combination of new products required, or a combination of each, such that the seller and the buyer must consider and compare many interrelated factors to achieve the desired solution and outcome. Enterprise-class software development projects, technical integration projects, large plant engineering projects, or construction projects are examples that illustrate high complexity situations. Selling organizations use a solution selling approach when one or more of the following circumstances exist:

 High levels of business, operations, technical, and or risk complexity are present in the current and or proposed solution
 Specialized experience is needed to assess the current scenario
 Specialized knowledge is required to develop and proposed a viable and appropriate solution that produces the desired outcome
 A combination and collaboration of products and services is necessary to create the desired results; third-parties organizations may need to supply and support portions of the solution
 Financial, technical and operational levels of risk exist for the buyer, the seller, or both parties
 A successful outcome requires high economic costs 
 A comprehensive understanding of the issues and a clear set of answers is not readily apparent to buyer or seller

According to the solution selling methodology, there is a formula for selling. Set each of these parameter to one or zero, because you need them all:
Pain x Power x Vision x Value x Control = Sale.

Origins of solution selling and terminology 
Frank Watts developed the sales process dubbed "solution selling" in 1975.  Watts perfected his method at Wang Laboratories.  He began teaching solution selling as an independent consultant in 1982. He presented his sales process as a one-day workshop to Xerox Corporation in 1982. By 1983 Electronics magazine would portray solution selling as "an unmistakable trend in the distribution of systems-related products".
In a 1984 account Dick Heiser could look back to IBM's pre-1975 "solution sale" methodology.

Mike Bosworth founded a sales training organization known as Solution Selling in 1983, based on his experiences at Xerox Corporation (the Huthwaite International SPIN (Situation, Problem, Implication, Need-payoff) selling pilot project)
and began licensing affiliates in 1988. With intellectual-property contributions from his affiliate network, Bosworth's methodology continued to evolve through the years. He sold the intellectual property in 1999 to one of his original affiliates, Keith M. Eades.

While 'solution selling' has become a generic term in many sales and selling organizations, Solution Selling as a brand denotes distinct characteristics. Followers of  "solution-selling" generally apply a consultative sales approach to all aspects of their sales process (or cycle) including:

 Prospecting
 Diagnosing customer needs
 Crafting a potential solution
 Establishing value
 Understanding the buying center / decision making unit (DMU)
 Bargaining for access to decision-makers
 Positioning proof, ROI and the total solution
 Negotiating a win-win solution
 Following up to ensure customer success

The solution selling methodology has evolved as key components of professional selling evolve. As a result, solution selling has become more broadly defined — to include dimensions of "sales process", "competitive selling", "value selling" as well as "consultative selling" or "complex selling" which set the focus on the team's aspects of the sales.

Solution selling in management contexts 
The advent of solution selling may have an impact on business models and on organization practices.
Eades and Kear discuss solution-centric organizations and the focal role of solution sales in such environments.
Robert J Calvin compares some of the financial implications of various type of sales: transactional sales, value-added sales, solution sales, and feature/benefit sales. Robert L Jolles proposed that, among managers and salespeople, a chosen solution is not always the best solution.

References

Business-to-business
Selling techniques